Emma Lew (born 1962) is a contemporary Australian poet.

Born in Melbourne, Emma Lew studied arts at Melbourne University and worked as a deckhand, shop assistant, proof-reader, and clerical assistant, only beginning to write poetry in 1993.

Her work has appeared in numerous journals and anthologies in Australia and overseas. Her second book, Anything the Landlord Touches, published in 2002 and reissued in the UK by Shearsman Books in 2006, won the 2003 C. J. Dennis Prize for Poetry (Victorian Premier's Prize) and the 2003 Judith Wright Calanthe Prize for Poetry (Queensland Premier's Prize).

A collection of German language translations of selected poems, Nesselgesang, was published in 2008 (translations by Mirko Bonné).

Works

Poetry
The Wild Reply. (Black Pepper publishing, 1997)  reviews
Anything the Landlord Touches. (Giramondo, 2002; Shearsman 2006)  review
Nesselgesang. (yedermann Verlag, 2008) 
Luminous Alias. (Vagabond Press, 2013)
Crow College: New and selected poems. (Giramondo, 2019)

References

External links
Poems & 'Working note' at However
Poems from Sport Magazine at New Zealand Electronic Text Centre
3 poems at Slope Magazine
4 poems at Shadowtrain

1962 births
Living people
University of Melbourne alumni
Poets from Melbourne
Australian women poets